Lesley Joseph (born September 14, 1981) is an American former professional tennis player.

Born in Rock Hill, South Carolina, Joseph was the first African-American to play collegiate tennis for the University of Georgia, where he was a three-time All-SEC. He was a member of Georgia's 2001 NCAA Division I Championship winning team, with his contribution in the final a win at number three singles over Peter Handoyo.

Joseph reached a career high singles ranking of 243 in the world while competing on the professional tour. He made it through to the final qualifying round of the 2006 Australian Open and also featured in the qualifying draws for Wimbledon and the US Open. As a doubles player he had a best ranking of 257 and won two ATP Challenger titles.

Challenger titles

Doubles: (2)

References

External links
 
 

1981 births
Living people
American male tennis players
African-American male tennis players
Georgia Bulldogs tennis players
Tennis people from South Carolina
People from Rock Hill, South Carolina
21st-century African-American sportspeople
20th-century African-American people